The 2011 Seguros Bolívar Open Cali was a professional tennis tournament played on clay courts. It was the fourth edition of the tournament which was part of the 2011 ATP Challenger Tour. It took place in Cali, Colombia between 19 and 25 September 2011.

Singles main-draw entrants

Seeds

 1 Rankings are as of September 12, 2011.

Other entrants
The following players received wildcards into the singles main draw:
  Nicolás Barrientos
  Felipe Escobar
  Alejandro Falla
  Horacio Zeballos

The following players received entry from the qualifying draw:
  Juan Sebastián Gómez
  Juan Pablo Ortiz
  Michael Quintero
  Sebastián Serrano

The following players received entry as a lucky loser into the singles main draw:
  Steffen Zornosa

Champions

Singles

 Alejandro Falla def.  Eduardo Schwank, 6–4, 6–3

Doubles

 Juan Sebastián Cabal /  Robert Farah def.  Facundo Bagnis /  Eduardo Schwank, 7–5, 6–2

External links
Official Website
ITF Search
ATP official site

Seguros Bolivar Open Cali
2011 in Colombian tennis
Tennis tournaments in Colombia
Seguros Bolívar Open Cali